Newspapers, radio, and television in the Quad Cities area of the United States.

Print
Three local daily newspapers serve the Quad Cities, all of them morning editions. The Quad-City Times, based in Davenport, is circulated throughout the Quad Cities metropolitan area, including Davenport, Bettendorf and Scott County in Iowa; and Moline, East Moline, Rock Island and Rock Island County in Illinois. The Dispatch / The Rock Island Argus, published in East Moline, is a daily newspaper based on the Illinois side. While the Times has a primary focus on the Iowa side, and a majority of the coverage in the Argus and Dispatch is on the Illinois side, both newspapers cover the entire Quad Cities.

The daily newspaper serving Henry County, Illinois, is the Star Courier, based in Kewanee.

Weekly newspapers in the Quad Cities include The North Scott Press, based in Eldridge and covering northern Scott County and the North Scott Community School District; the Erie Review (based in Erie in Whiteside County, Illinois, but also including coverage of upper Rock Island County including Port Byron and the Riverdale Community Unit School District 100); and Henry County weeklies including the Cambridge Chronicle, Geneseo Republic and Orion Gazette. The Aledo Times-Record is the weekly newspaper for Mercer County.

The River Cities' Reader is the area's alternative weekly. In addition to in-depth stories and editorials covering government and culture in the Quad Cities, issues of the Reader contain listings of arts and entertainment events taking place throughout the area, and provides critical reviews for regional art exhibitions, music concerts, and theatrical performances.

Radio
Start dates are for the frequency/station license, not for callsign or programming that may have moved from license to license.

FM

  displays artist and title on Radio Data System
  FM translator: repeats another station's program
  K296GZ is separately owned from WLLR-FM but utilizes WLLR's third HD Radio digital subchannel via a leasing agreement to relay the Radio By Grace network programming to the K296GZ translator

AM

In addition, the Quad Cities had three AM allocations that are now silent:

 WKBF, which went on the air in 1925 (originally as WHBF) at 1270 AM and last formatted Mexican/Hispanic music as "La Jefe 1270." The station went off the air in the fall of 2018, and its license was cancelled by the Federal Communications Commission on June 1, 2020.

 An allocation at 1500 AM, assigned to Geneseo, Illinois, which went silent in the late 1990s and held the call letters WGEN. The station had been paired with an FM signal at 104.9, which was later sold to other owners (currently Townsquare Media) and its city of license moved to DeWitt, Iowa.

 An allocation at 1580 AM, which has been silent since 2000 after several years of format and ownership changes. That station was last known as KFQC, a black gospel station. The station originally signed on the air in 1952 as KFMA, and at its height was known as KWNT and formatted country music. Various formats, including urban contemporary and nostalgia/adult standards, would air on the frequency from the early 1980s until going off the air.

Television

Quad Cities
Quad Cities